The Lamar Hunt Pioneer Cup is a Major League Soccer (MLS) series between FC Dallas and the Columbus Crew . The series is named after the late Lamar Hunt, who was one of the league's early major investors and a key supporter of American soccer. Initially, the series was contested between the two teams still owned by the Hunt Sports Group (Sporting Kansas City was also previously owned by the Hunt Sports Group, but was sold before the Pioneer Cup began). However, Columbus was sold in 2013, and thus FC Dallas remains the only MLS team still owned by the Hunt Sports Group. The Pioneer Cup is the second event in American soccer named after Lamar Hunt, whose name is also given to the Lamar Hunt U.S. Open Cup.

The first two editions of the Pioneer Cup were single preseason matches. The inaugural edition was played on March 11, 2007 at Pizza Hut Park (now known as Toyota Stadium), with Columbus defeating Dallas 3–0. Proceeds from the game went to the charity Dallas SCORES. The second edition of the Cup was played on March 20, 2010, at Pizza Hut Park with Dallas defeating Columbus 2–1 in heavy snow.

In 2011, the Pioneer Cup was changed to a two-game, aggregate-goal series played during the regular season. The first leg was played at Columbus Crew Stadium in Columbus, Ohio, on April 1, 2011. The Crew took advantage of FC Dallas going one man down in the 33rd minute to win 2–0. The second and deciding leg was played at Pizza Hut Park in Frisco, Texas, on July 2, 2011, with Dallas winning 2–0. Tied 2–2 on aggregate, Columbus regained the Pioneer Cup with the tie being broken by all-time head-to-head goals, 6–4 in favor of Columbus.

When Major League Soccer restructured scheduling ahead of the 2012 season, Columbus and Dallas would play only once in the regular season. Therefore, the Cup was changed to a one-game, winner-take-all contest. In the event of a draw, the all time head-to-head goals tiebreaker remained. In the 2013 edition, Columbus scored four goals with three different scorers to win the Cup for the second straight year. The 2014 contest was a bit more lackluster than previous encounters. An early summer thunderstorm suspended the start of the match and then eventually postponed it to the following day after a Columbus fan was struck by lightning and injured prior to the game being started. The game was played the next day on a hot afternoon, but no player from either side could find the net in a match then ended scoreless. Due to the scoreless draw, Columbus retained the Cup for the third year in a row due to the all-time head-to-head goals tiebreaker being 12–7 in Columbus' favor.

Columbus played their last match with FC Dallas in 2019 at the Historic Crew Stadium (known as Mapfre Stadium at the time) on March 16, 2019. Columbus would later move to Lower.com Field in July 2021.

In the 2021 MLS Season, neither Columbus nor Dallas would play each other for the first time since 2009 due to the small number of inter-conference matches taken place between Eastern and Western conference teams.

Winners

Match Results

References

Columbus Crew
FC Dallas
Major League Soccer rivalries
Soccer cup competitions in the United States